Medlov is the name of several locations in the Czech Republic:

Medlov (Brno-Country District), a market town in the South Moravian Region
Medlov (Olomouc District), a municipality and village in the Olomouc Region